Okkadunnadu is a 2007 Indian Telugu-language action thriller film directed by Chandra Sekhar Yeleti. The film stars Gopichand and Neha Jhulka with Mahesh Manjrekar playing the antagonist role. The music was composed by M. M. Keeravani and the film was produced by Cherry under the banner of 'Clap Productions'. 

The film was released theatrically on 3 March 2007. It received positive reviews from critics and was successful at the box office.

Plot 
Kiran arrives in Mumbai to sell his guest house through a real estate agent named Gautami. When he helps a man in need of the Bombay blood Group, he is asked for help by an ailing gangster named Sona Bhai, with the same blood group. When Kiran goes to donate blood, Sona's nephew secretly tells him that he would be killed. A sedated Kiran falls asleep, and as he's taken to the operation theatre, Sona's blood pressure increases uncontrollably, making the doctors decide to wait till the next 24 hours.

Upon waking up, Kiran is told by Jayadev to first donate and then leave the next day, but realizing their true intentions, Kiran fights off all the henchmen and escapes, much to the disappointment of Sona. Kiran is later contacted by Sona's nephew, who tells him that his heart is needed for transplantation and not just his blood and that it's Sona Bhai who wants it. He also tells him to leave Mumbai. Jayadev visits Gautami's office to buy Kiran's guest house but is told that it's sold and the seller has gone to Hyderabad. Upon exiting, Jayadev finds Kiran, and a chase ensues, resulting in a fight where Kiran beats up Jayadev's henchmen all by himself.

While having drinks with Gautami, Kiran explains how he led a luxurious life thanks to his father, an honest private bank owner, who was arrested when the bank had fallen into losses and failed to pay the depositors. The company's auditor told Kiran the bank suffered as the other board of directors provided large amounts as loans to VIPs who later failed to repay, but Kiran's father still tried to help by selling most of his property. Kiran got his father out on bail and promised to clear the payment issues. For financial help, they met RBI official Janakiram, who demanded 4 crore as a bribe. Thus, Kiran came to Mumbai to get payment for the guest house in 6 months.

Sona's henchmen and Kiran engage in a violent fight where Kiran gets injected with a sedative that would put him to sleep within 4 minutes. Kiran uses improvised weapons and kills everyone within 3 minutes, escapes with Gautami, and later reveals everything about Sona to her. Seth who purchased the guest house tells Kiran that he doesn't want it anymore, due to which Kiran beats up his men and orders him to pay the amount within the next 30 minutes.

Kiran and Gautami wait for him at the beach, where Sona's nephew turns up and reveals that Seth won't pay him. Realizing Seth has left due to the fear of getting killed by Sona, Kiran asks Gautami to arrange for a new buyer. He then meets Sona's nephew, who reveals Sona's a threat to him as long as he's alive, and the only way to kill him now is by killing Kiran. A fight ensues, and Kiran beats up everyone but spares Sona's nephew as he had helped him earlier.

Kiran then contacts his father and learns that a company named Jayadev Investments from Mumbai is ready to invest 200 crore in their bank. Kiran is shocked to realize it was Sona who called his father and would pay him in exchange for his heart. Kiran asks for some time to think about it. Kiran asks Gautami to still look for a buyer for his guest house, and she contacts Jayadev, who agrees to buy it.

Jayadev, however, vandalizes her office and tells her to inform Kiran that Sona would pay him 200 crore. Before she can reach Kiran, he goes to meet Sona, who purchased the guest house and threatens to rip his pipes if he doesn't pay him for it. After getting  4 crore, Kiran goes to meet Janakiram, who has arrived in Mumbai, at a hotel where he finds a CD and a player. The footage reveals Janakiram had joined hands with Jayadev, but still got killed.

Jayadev had promised him  10 crore to not do Kiran's job. Kiran arrives at Sona's place and gets into a fight with his goons. During the fight, Sona's nephew secretly tells him the room number where he would find the money. Kiran acquires the money and destroys Sona's life support carrier. Sona's nephew is exposed when the room number written on his hand is seen by Sona and Jayadev. Sona reveals that he wanted him to die because he wanted his power, following which he's killed, and Sona dies. Kiran engages in a gunfight and, in the end, survives an explosion while others die. Eventually, Jayadev shoots himself, and Kiran flees with the money.

Cast

Gopichand as Kiran
Neha Jhulka as Gautami
Mahesh Manjrekar as Sona Bhai
Suman as Gowri Shankar
Rahul Dev as Sona's nephew
Nassar as Jayadev
Brahmanandam as Satyanarayana, Company's Auditor
Tanikella Bharani as Reserve Bank Official 
Pragathi as Kiran's mother
Giri Babu as Gautami's father
Raghu Babu as Marwadi 
Banerjee as Gowri's brother-in-law
Rao Ramesh as Man Searching for Bombay Blood Group
Hema as Kiran's aunt
Sivannarayana Naripeddi as Doctor
Krishnudu as Junior Doctor
Uttej as Constable
Shobha Rani as Gautami's mother
Giridhar as Gautami's assistant 
Madhuri as Anchor
Ragasya as an item number

Soundtrack

Music composed by M.M. Keeravani. Music released on Vel Records Company.

Reception 
The film received the positive response from the critics. Idlebrain.com gave a review of rating 3.25/5 terming it a "Blood Chase". IndiaGlitz gave a review stating "Chandrasekhar Yeleti, a champion of gripping screenplay passes yet again with flying colours. The director was able to carry the whole film on action and was able to cater to the masses." Oneindia Entertainment gave a review stating "The film might run well in B, C centres because of its mass appeal with good action scenes. Can be recommended to watch once only if you are interested in action films." Sify gave a review stating "Technically Okkadunnadu is brilliant with Gummadi Jaya Krishna excellent photography, and editing is slick. MM Keeravani's music is not great, but he scores in re-recording. In a nutshell, the film is an average flick which caters to urban audiences."

References

External links
 

2007 films
Films scored by M. M. Keeravani
2007 action thriller films
Indian action thriller films
Films set in Mumbai
2000s Telugu-language films
Films directed by Chandra Sekhar Yeleti